Giving You the Best That I Got may refer to:

 Giving You the Best That I Got (album), a 1988 album by Anita Baker
 "Giving You the Best That I Got" (song), a 1988 song by Baker